Labrisomus is a genus of labrisomid blennies native to the western Atlantic ocean and the eastern Pacific Ocean.

Species
There are currently 11 recognized species in this genus:

 Labrisomus conditus I. Sazima (fr), Carvalho-Filho, Gasparini & C. Sazima, 2009 (Masquerader hairy blenny)
 Labrisomus cricota I. Sazima (fr), Gasparini & R. L. Moura, 2002 (Mock blenny)
 Labrisomus fernandezianus (Guichenot, 1848)
 Labrisomus jenkinsi (Heller & Snodgrass, 1903) (Jenkins' blenny)
 Labrisomus multiporosus C. Hubbs, 1953 (Porehead blenny)
 Labrisomus nuchipinnis (Quoy & Gaimard, 1824) (Hairy blenny)
 Labrisomus philippii (Steindachner, 1866) (Chalapo clinid)
 Labrisomus pomaspilus V. G. Springer & Rosenblatt, 1965
 Labrisomus socorroensis C. Hubbs, 1953 (Misspelled blenny)
 Labrisomus wigginsi C. Hubbs, 1953 (Baja blenny)
 Labrisomus xanti T. N. Gill, 1860 (Largemouth blenny)

References

 
Labrisomidae
Marine fish genera
Taxa named by William John Swainson